"California Girls" is a song by the American rock band the Beach Boys from their 1965 album, Summer Days (And Summer Nights!!). Written by Brian Wilson and Mike Love, the lyrics detail an appreciation for women across the world and a wish that they all lived in the band's home state, California. It was released as a single, backed with "Let Him Run Wild", and reached number 3 on the Billboard Hot 100. It was also a top 10 hit in several other countries, becoming one of the band's most successful songs globally.

Wilson conceived "California Girls" during his first acid trip while thinking about women and Western film scores. The song is distinguished for its orchestral prelude, layered vocals, and chromaticism. Wilson later referred to it as "a hymn to youth", the Beach Boys' "anthem", and his favorite record by the group, although he remained dissatisfied with their vocal performance. It was the band's first recording with touring musician Bruce Johnston, who was not yet an official member of the group.

"California Girls" inspired the Beatles' parody "Back in the U.S.S.R." and many songs with similar or identical titles, including Big Star's "September Gurls", the Magnetic Fields' "California Girls", and Katy Perry's "California Gurls". In 1984, David Lee Roth recorded a cover version that also peaked at number 3. In 2010, the Beach Boys' recording was inducted into the Grammy Hall of Fame, and in 2011, Rolling Stone ranked it number 72 on its list of the greatest songs of all time. The Rock and Roll Hall of Fame included it as one of "500 Songs That Shaped Rock and Roll".

Background

Brian Wilson, according to some accounts, was inspired to write "California Girls" during his first time taking the psychedelic drug LSD, an occasion supervised by his friend Loren Schwartz. Wilson corroborated in the 2004 documentary Beautiful Dreamer that he had written the song while on his first acid trip, but in the 2021 documentary Long Promised Road, he stated that he wrote the song during the week after the trip when he was sober.

In a 2007 interview, Wilson explained that he had gone to his piano and "was thinking about the music from cowboy movies. And I sat down and started playing it, bum-buhdeeda, bum-buhdeeda. I did that for about an hour. I got these chords going. Then I got this melody, it came pretty fast after that." He said that "California Girls" was intended to encapsulate the feel of the Drifters' version of "On Broadway". and on other occasions, said that the shuffle beat in the song was influenced by Bach's "Jesu, Joy of Man's Desiring".

The next day, as Wilson recalled, he and his bandmate Mike Love finished the remainder of the song.  Love was not originally listed as the song's co-writer, but was awarded a credit after his successful 1990s lawsuit for songwriting credits. He said that he approached Wilson about the omission when the song was released, and that Wilson had told him that the mistake was the fault of Wilson's father Murry, the band's publisher. In a 1988 interview, Brian blamed himself. "I knew that my dad made a mistake by putting my name on there only." Session musician Carol Kaye, who played on the recording, credited all the music to Wilson, with the only exception being a bass fill she invented at the end of the bridge section.

Wilson and Love later disagreed over the extent of their lyrical contributions. Love said that he wrote "every syllable" of the song apart from "I wish they all could be California girls". In his recollection, he wrote the lyrics "in less than an hour" while he was in the hallway of the recording studio during the session for the backing track. Wilson disputed Love's assertion. "I wrote a lot of those lyrics too; it was line for line, back and forth between us. That's what happened." He said that he came up with the opening lines and subject matter, and that "Every other line was his or mine. ... Everybody loves girls, right? Everybody loves California and the sun. That’s what I wanted from the song. And to mention all the parts of the country, that’s fun, people will like that."

Lyrics

The lyrics describe an appreciation for the qualities of girls from different regions of the United States and the wish that "they all could be" in the narrator's home state of California. Among the qualities that the narrator appreciates are "East Coast girls" for being "hip", "southern girls" for "the way they talk", the "northern girls" for "the way they kiss", and the "Midwest farmer's daughter" for making "you feel all right". After the first chorus, the West Coast is invoked for its "sunshine" and tanned girls, with an additional reference to a "French bikini on Hawaii Island". At the end of the lyric, the singer declares that, having had the experience of seeing "all kinds of girls" from "all around this great big world", the U.S. contains "the cutest" of them all.

According to Love, the lyrics were inspired by the band's first time touring Europe and the UK in November 1964. He felt that he failed to impart the message that he had "originally intended" with the lyric. "I wanted the song to be a tribute to girls everywhere—not just in the United States, let alone California, but everywhere in the world." Biographer Mark Dillon wrote that Love's lyrics "show [that he keeps] concert-goers top of mind" and that the  "Midwest farmer's daughter" line elicited the greatest applause when the group performed the song live.

Composition

"California Girls" begins with an orchestral prelude and contains a similar chord sequence and call-and-response vocal lines as Wilson's previous song "Don't Hurt My Little Sister" from The Beach Boys Today!. According to writer Maury Dean, "Musically, 'California Girls' is an adventure in chromatics; any garage band trying to follow their bizarre VII tidal wave of dipping and swooping chromatic major chords will have to buy the sheet music, or hire Sherlock Holmes to find the missing chords." Musicologist Walter Everett identifies the use of VII — IV in the chorus to suggest a chromaticized major key with minor pentatonic inflections.

Music theorist Daniel Harrison compared the song to Wilson's later "God Only Knows", as both songs avoid a root-position tonic and suppress a cadential drive. The refrain alternates between the I and ii7 without ever meeting the expected V. Highlighting this, Harrison, citing an insight on the part of Everett, writes that the "wish that 'they all could be California girls' is, of course, impossible to realize; the inability of I-II to reach V, then, underscores this impossibility."

Recording
On April 6, 1965, Wilson produced the backing track of "California Girls" (then given the working title "We Don't Know") with a host of session musicians at Western Studio in Hollywood. It required 44 takes before Wilson could deem a satisfactory performance, with the session concluding after midnight. Problems had arisen from the tempo and guitar part in the introduction, which fatigued Wilson, engineer Chuck Britz, and the dozen-plus session players.

The song did not appear to have lyrics or a title at this juncture, and Wilson can be heard calling the song "Oh Yeah" and "You're Grass and I'm a Power Mower". In his 2016 memoir, Wilson remembered: "When we got into the studio with Chuck, he said that he wanted Carl's twelve-string guitar in the intro to sound more direct. I didn’t know what that meant. 'Can he play it in the booth?' Chuck said. I had never thought about that before, but it seemed like a good idea. Carl was standing next to me in the booth and all the other musicians were out in the studio. I conducted it like an orchestra." According to biographer Peter Ames Carlin, Wilson's father Murry urged Brian to eliminate the orchestral prelude, as he felt that it made the song excessively complex.

Vocal overdubs followed on June 4 at Columbia studio. Wilson recorded the Beach Boys' vocals using Columbia's new 8-track recorder, allowing Love's lead vocals to be triple-tracked and the group's vocals spread over three more. According to historian Keith Badman, the song still lacked "a proper title", as Wilson can be heard referring to it as "Yeah, I Dig the Girls" on the session tape. It was the first Beach Boys recording to feature vocals from Bruce Johnston, who had recently joined the group to substitute for Wilson on concert tours. As Johnston remembered, "I came home from The Beach Boys' tour [on June 1] and they said, 'Why don't you come and sing on our next album?' The first song I sang on was 'California Girls'. At this point I still wasn't a proper member of the group."

Release
On July 5, 1965, "California Girls" was released as the leading track on side two of the Beach Boys' album Summer Days (And Summer Nights!!). On July 12, it was issued as a single backed with "Let Him Run Wild". It debuted on the Billboard Top 40 chart at number 28, and at the end of August peaked at number 3, just below the Beatles' "Help!" and Bob Dylan's "Like a Rolling Stone". In the UK, the single was released in August. In September, it peaked at number 28 in the Netherlands. In October, it peaked at number 26 in the UK, 30 in Germany and 6 in Sweden.

Cash Box described the single as an "easy-going shuffle which touts the many positive aspects of the Golden Gate state distaffers."

The Beach Boys sang the song over a pre-recorded backing track during their appearances on the television programs The Andy Williams Show (on October 22) and Jack Benny Hour (on October 23). In the latter, the group were featured in a humorous sketch with host Jack Benny and comedian Bob Hope, who act as old surfers that are struggling to understand the sport's slang terms.

Recognition and legacy

"California Girls" is among the Beach Boys' most commercially successful songs globally. It has been performed thousands of times in concert as the band's opening number. Carlin called the orchestral introduction "as spare and stirring as anything by Aaron Copland". Dillon referred to the passage as "one of pop music's great intros" and "Brian's proclamation to the rest of the music biz that he was a composer to take seriously". Los Angeles Times journalist Geoff Boucher, writing in his article about the song, said that the opening lyrics were "one of the most famous ... in pop music" and described the music as "equal parts symphony hall and amusement park, 2 1/2 minutes of nuanced musical complexity and beach-blanket simplicity." The song was also influential in the development of the power pop genre.

Wilson stated in an interview, "The intro to this song is the greatest piece of music I've ever written ... The song was a big record for us but I never really liked anything but the intro." In 1970, he said that he disliked the recorded vocal performance and added, "If I could, I'd re-record that one ... We rushed the beat on that one." In 2010, he told Dillon that it was the band's finest record and said, "You could call it our anthem."

In 2010, the Beach Boys' recording was inducted into the Grammy Hall of Fame for its "lasting qualitative or historical significance." In 2011, Rolling Stone magazine ranked it number 72 on its list of the "500 Greatest Songs of All Time", where it was described as "tougher than earlier Beach Boys hits, with tightly wound harmonies and an aggressive lead vocal." , it is listed as the 815th highest rated song of all time on Acclaimed Music.

Cultural references
The Beatles' "Back in the U.S.S.R." (1968) features a bridge section based on the song. Wilson said that the Beatles' song "blew my mind" when he first heard it, although he did not realize that it was a send-up of "California Girls" until the fact was pointed out to him. Strawberry Alarm Clock, who toured with the Beach Boys in 1966–67, segues into the intro and first line of "California Girls" at the end of their song "Small Package", on their album Good Morning Starshine (1969). "California Girls" has also been adopted in numerous television commercials and jingles. It served as a tongue-in-cheek musical cue in the James Bond film A View to a Kill (1985).

"California Girls" inspired the titles of Big Star's "September Gurls" (1974) and identically-named songs by Gretchen Wilson (from her 2006 album All Jacked Up) and the Magnetic Fields (from their 2008 album Distortion). The latter song describes a protagonist who wishes to murder upper-class girls from California with a battle axe, a theme that carried on from Sonic Youth's "Expressway to Yr. Skull" from Evol (1986). Katy Perry's "California Gurls" (2010) initiated a dispute with publisher Rondor Music regarding its use of the lyric "I wish they all could be California girls".

Magnetic Fields frontman Stephin Merritt commented on the various songs, "when I wrote [my] 'California Girls' ...  the listener is supposed to know that there is already a song with that title. ... It would be good to write a response song to that [Katy Perry single]. An answer song, to be called 'California Grrrls,' g-r-r-r-l-s, about the Riot Grrrl alleged movement. One could go on and on with 'California Girls,' it’s a pretty large topic, with a lot to say."

David Lee Roth version

"California Girls" was covered by David Lee Roth on his 1985 EP Crazy from the Heat (with background vocals by Beach Boy Carl Wilson along with Christopher Cross). Like the original, it peaked at number 3 on the Billboard Hot 100. The Federico Fellini-esque music video, directed by Pete Angelus and Roth and inspired by Fellini's Amarcord, was released in January 1985.

In the video, Roth stars as a tour guide, showing tourists (one played by Jane Leeves, who went on to play Frasiers Daphne Moon), the beach and swimsuit models. The female bodybuilder featured in the video is Roth's personal fitness trainer, Kay Baxter. The scenes follow the lyrics with bikini-clad women from all regions of the US. An oft-imitated scene has Roth dancing down a sidewalk bordered by models frozen like mannequins. "That is Diamond Dave, the character," he observed. "That is definitely a part of me: I grew up in that whole Southern California thing. I dee-lite in it! But you don't have to be there to celebrate the spirit."

Personnel
Per band archivist Craig Slowinski:

The Beach Boys
 Al Jardine – harmony and backing vocals
 Mike Love – lead and bass vocals
 Brian Wilson – harmony and backing vocals
 Carl Wilson – harmony and backing vocals, 12-string guitar
 Dennis Wilson – harmony and backing vocals

Guest
 Bruce Johnston – harmony and backing vocals

Session musicians (also known as "the Wrecking Crew")

 Hal Blaine – drums
 Frank Capp – vibraphone
 Roy Caton – trumpet
 Jerry Cole – twelve-string guitar
 Al De Lory – Hammond B-3 organ
 Steve Douglas – tenor saxophone
 Jay Migliori – baritone saxophone
 Jack Nimitz – bass saxophone
 Carol Kaye – bass guitar
 Lyle Ritz – upright bass
 Howard Roberts – electric guitar
 Leon Russell – piano
 Billy Strange – tambourine

Charts

Weekly album charts

Year-end charts

Notes

References

Bibliography

External links
 

1965 songs
1965 singles
The Beach Boys songs
1984 debut singles
David Lee Roth songs
Jan and Dean songs
Leif Garrett songs
Songs about California
Songs written by Brian Wilson
Songs written by Mike Love
Song recordings produced by Brian Wilson
Song recordings produced by Ted Templeman
Number-one singles in South Africa
Grammy Hall of Fame Award recipients
Capitol Records singles
Warner Records singles
Art pop songs
California Sound
Song recordings with Wall of Sound arrangements